Kholm may refer to:

Kholm, Afghanistan, a town in Afghanistan
Kholm, Russia, name of several inhabited localities in Russia
 Kholm, Kholmsky District, Novgorod Oblast
Kholm, transliteration of Ukrainian name for the town of Chełm (Eastern Poland)

See also 
 Kholmsky (disambiguation)
 Kholm Governorate (disambiguation)